Lychway are an English, Suffolk born five piece melodic hardcore band, who formed in January 2011 in Ipswich. After major line-up changes and different bands they established their sound through hard work and effort. In July 2011 they completed their first UK tour with punk giants Floods, played with such bands as Heights, Hands Like Houses and Polar. 2012 saw Lychway with a new line-up, single and booking tours throughout the UK, Europe and US for 2013.

History
Lychway formed in January 2011 after the disbandment of previous projects.

Following the release of their demo in March 2011 and debut EP in August 2011, the band received local and national radio airplay on BBC Suffolk radio, Kerrang! radio and were featured in national music press Kerrang! magazine. The band performed an extensive number of shows across the UK and have played with Heights, The Elijah, Feed The Rhino, Hopes Die Last and many more.

On 26 September 2011, Hevypetal announced that vocalist Curtis Moore was leaving the band. Curtis stated "For the details as to why I am leaving, there are many, but some of which is the commitment to another aspect of my life and personal and professional conflicts." On January 1, 2012, Hevypetal announced that vocalist Fraser Goodwin and guitarist Ben Webber would be joining to replace Curtis and guitarist Law Peto.

On 6 July 2013, Lychway appeared out of the blue again to play "Ipstock 2013" with Curtis Moore back on vocals and Daniel Owen, a local freelance designer in place of Law Peto on guitar.

Following on from another silent period on 14 April 2014, they announced on their Facebook page about plans to make a new EP and play shows again for summer 2014.

Members
Curtis Moore - Vocals
Daniel Owen - Guitar
Callum Brogan - Guitar
Aaron Fair - Bass
Tobias Houghton - Drums

Discography

References

Melodic hardcore groups
Musical groups from Suffolk